Windmills of the Soul is the debut album of Korean-American hip hop artist Kero One, released February 7, 2006, on Plug Label.

Music
A Jazz hiphop album that infused dusty drums with plenty of live instrumentation.

Windmills of the Soul was produced using the Asr-10 and Mpc-2000.

Reception
XLR8R magazine called it lyrically compelling. Oozing dusty drum breaks, mellow loops, and live instrumentation aplenty-Fender Rhodes, sax, and guitar are all present.

Track listing
All tracks written and produced by Kero One except track 5 & 9 by King Most.

Personnel
Credits for Windmills of the Soul adapted from Discogs.<ref>'"</ref>

Kero one – producer, mixing
Niamaj – rap
Vince Czekusk –guitar, fender rhodes
King Most – associate producer
Eddy Schreyer – engineer
Seoul Control – turntables
Danny Song – photography
Kento Tanaka – design, cover art concept

Singles

References

External links
 '' at Discogs

2006 debut albums
Kero One albums